The 2006 Clemson Tigers baseball team represented Clemson University in the 2006 NCAA Division I baseball season. The team played their home games at Doug Kingsmore Stadium in Clemson, SC.

The team was coached by Jack Leggett, who completed his thirteenth season at Clemson.  The Tigers reached the 2006 College World Series, their eleventh appearance in Omaha.

Roster

Schedule

Ranking movements

References

Clemson
Clemson Tigers baseball seasons
Clemson baseball
Atlantic Coast Conference baseball champion seasons
College World Series seasons
Clemson